Qaiser Abbas (born 7 May 1982) is a Pakistani cricketer who played in one Test match in 2000. He has played first-class cricket, mostly for National Bank of Pakistan, since 1999. He has also played for Rajshahi Rangers in the Bangladesh T20 competition.

References

1982 births
Living people
Pakistan Test cricketers
Pakistani cricketers
People from Muridke
National Bank of Pakistan cricketers
Sialkot cricketers
Quetta cricketers
Sheikhupura cricketers
Sialkot Stallions cricketers
Quetta Bears cricketers
Rajshahi Division cricketers
Rajshahi Royals cricketers